Favriella weberi is an extinct species of sea snail, a marine gastropod mollusk in the family Raphitomidae.

Description

Distribution
Fossils of this marine species were found in Pliocene strata of the Alpes-Maritimes, France

References

 Hornung, A. "Gastéropodes fossiles du Rio Torsero (Ceriale) Pliocène inférieur de la Ligurie." Ann. Mus. Civ. Stor. Nat. Doria 9 (1920): 70–92.
 Chirli (C.) & Richard (C.), 2008 - Les Mollusques plaisanciens de la Côte d’Azur, p. 1-128

External links
 MNHN, Paris: specimen

weberi
Gastropods described in 1920